Manuel Asur (Manuel Asur GONZÁLEZ GARCÍA) (Güeria Carrocera, San Martín del Rey Aurelio, Asturias, 1947) is a Spanish essayist and poet in Asturian. He's considered to be one of the first modern poets in this language. He has a PhD degree in Philosophy. His book, Cancios y poemes pa un riscar ('Songs and Poems to a Dawn') meant the beginning in 1977 of the rebirth (Asturian surdimientu) of asturian literature, because he contributed with a poetry more newfangled and risked than anything written before in this language. Most of their works talk about the socio-political facts of the moment. Some of their poems became very popular in Asturias in the 1970s since the group Nuberu used them as lyrics for their songs. He wrote also a narrative book in 1987, Hai una llinia trazada ('There's a Drawn Line'), with short stories that he say to consider "almost monologues". He's a current articulist of La Nueva España publications and works in the Consejería de Medio Rural y Pesca del Principado de Asturias.

Books published
Cancios y poemes pa un riscar (1977). Author's edition. 
Camín del cumal fonderu ('Going to the Deeper Peak') (1978). Author's edition. 
Vívese d'oyíes: Poemes bilingües ('Living by Hearsay: Bilingual Poems') (1979). Seminariu de Llingua Asturiana 
Congoxa que ye amor ('This Anguish is Love') (1982). Author's edition. 
Destruición del poeta ('Destruction of the Poet') (1984). Academia de la Llingua Asturiana 
Hai una llinia trazada (short stories) (1987). Academia de la Llingua Asturiana 
Poesía 1976-1996 ('Poetry 1976-1996', selected works) (1996). Trabe 
Orbayos ('Drizzles') (2002). Trabe 
El libro de las visitas ('The Visitor's Book', in Spanish language) (2003). Trabe 
Lo que dice la caracola ('What the conch says', in Spanish)(2007) Lulu.com 
El solitario de Avilés—Vida y obra del filósofo Estanislao Sánchez Calvo ('The Solitary from Aviles—The Life and Work of Philosopher Estanislao Sánchez Calvo', in spanish language)(2008). I.S.B.N: 978-1-4092-0593-7
Balada del balagar (2011) Lulu.com  (Astur language) Poemes.
Las arrogancias del barro (2015) in Spanish ,  lulu.com

External links
 El sombreru de Virxilio. Biography, bibliography and two poems of Manuel Asur (in Asturian language)

1947 births
Living people
People from San Martín del Rey Aurelio
20th-century Spanish writers
20th-century Spanish male writers
21st-century Spanish writers
Writers from Asturias
Asturian language